Auguste-Laurent Burdeau (10 September 185112 December 1894) was a French politician.

He was the son of a laborer at Lyon. Forced from childhood to earn his own living, he was enabled to secure an education by bursarships at the Lycée at Lyon and at the Lycée Louis-le-Grand in Paris.

In 1870 he was at the École Normale Supérieure in Paris, but enlisted in the army, and was wounded and made prisoner in 1871 (during the Franco-Prussian War). In 1874 he became professor of philosophy, and translated several works of Herbert Spencer and of Schopenhauer into French. He was author of a moral instruction text book used in Saint-Sauveur-en-Puisaye.

His extraordinary aptitude for work secured for him the position of chef de cabinet under Paul Bert, the minister of education, in 1880s. In 1885 he was elected deputy for the département of the Rhône, and distinguished himself in financial questions. In 1887, he served as rapporteur for the education budget, and he was the general rapporteur for the budget in 1889. He was several times minister, and became minister of finance in the cabinet of Casimir-Perier (from 3 November 1893 to 22 May 1894). On the 5 July 1894 he was elected president of the chamber of deputies. He died on the 12 December 1894, said to be worn out with overwork. He considered hard work a fundamental ingredient of civilization.

French policy on Algeria
The budget report presented to the Chamber of Deputies on 4 December 1891 by Auguste Burdeau was one of the major events in French discussion of Algeria. He, during his two hours speech, provided a more general analysis of French policy in Algeria. He feared bringing colonial subjects into contact with imperial culture and refused to allow them full participation in that culture. Burdeau's examination of problems of the indigenous people into French nation shaped the French’s policy on Algeria.

References

1851 births
1894 deaths
People from Lyon
French republicans
Ministers of Marine and the Colonies
French Ministers of Finance
Presidents of the Chamber of Deputies (France)
Members of the 4th Chamber of Deputies of the French Third Republic
Members of the 5th Chamber of Deputies of the French Third Republic
Members of the 6th Chamber of Deputies of the French Third Republic
Lycée Louis-le-Grand alumni
Lycée Louis-le-Grand teachers
French military personnel of the Franco-Prussian War
Burials at Père Lachaise Cemetery